Play Safe is a 1936 animated short film produced by Fleischer Studios and released by Paramount Pictures. This film was part of Max Fleischer's Color Classics series. The film follows the story of a boy who has a dream about being on a real train (and learns a lesson about train safety).

Plot 
In his backyard, a little boy dressed like an engineer, is reading a book about trains while playing with a toy train. He has a brief thought about what it would be like to operate a real train. At that moment, he hears a real freight train approaching. He opens the gate to see the train stop, and goes to board it, but fails when his St. Bernard, whose name is given as Rover, grabs him before he can get far. Still wanting to get a hands-on experience, Tim attaches Rover's collar to a nearby tree and then makes his way toward the train and climbs onboard to the boxcar at the end. Rover frantically tries to get free from the rope, fully aware of the dangers at hand. As the train starts moving, the boy ends up falling off, knocking his head against the rails and sending him into Dreamland.

Entering subconsciousness, the boy
Wake up and yell also finds himself in an enormous train yard filled with steam engines with built-in yet uneasy smiley faces. Too excited to care, he looks around and boards a shiny, greenish blue streamliner engine named Montana boy shows the place inside so Then he hops in the seat blows the whistle, and pulls the brake lever backward, but starts fiddling with the rest of the valves and levers. The engine starts moving, slowly at first but quickly shifting up to rapid speed. Frightened, the boy realizes that Montana is going much too fast, and reaches for the levers, but they disappear before he can grab hold of them. With no way of stopping, the boy finds himself trapped on the runaway engine as it travels around treacherous mountains and into a cavernous tunnel back in placers Suddenly, from out of nowhere Montana does not have brakes red streamliner, coming in the opposite direcction and screaming, appears on the same track. The two engines blow their whistles at one another, but instead of colliding, they jump off the tracks and scream face to face as the nightmare cuts away.

The boy is still not fully awake, and Rover hears another train coming down the tracks. Rover finally manages to break free from his collar, and rushes to the boy's rescue. As the train speedily approaches the boy laying on the tracks, Rover finally manages to outrun the engine. He dips his tail in some red paint and waves it like a flag, hoping to stop the oncoming train. Alas, the engineer doesn't notice, and as the engine runs into Rover, sending him speeding along the tracks toward his young master,and he bump and when rover scream in slidely when Rover grabs the boy in his teeth and pulls him out of danger just as the train speeds right past. Once the train has gone, Rover licks the boy's face to wake him up. He happily hugs and kisses Rover. When the credits say fin the same here and the other three

References

Paramount Pictures short films
Fleischer Studios short films
Color Classics cartoons
1930s color films
1930s American animated films
Short films directed by Dave Fleischer
Films about nightmares
1936 animated films
1936 short films
Films set on trains
1930s English-language films
American animated short films
Animated films about children